Lucy Wheelock (February 1, 1857October 1, 1946) was an American early childhood education pioneer within the American kindergarten movement. She began her career by teaching the kindergarten program at Chauncy-Hall School (1879–89). Wheelock was the founder and head of Wheelock Kindergarten Training School, which later became Wheelock College in Boston, Massachusetts, and is now the namesake of Boston University's college of education BU Wheelock. She wrote, lectured, and translated on subjects related to education.

Early life and education
Lucy Wheelock was born in Cambridge, Vermont, February 1, 1857. Her parents included Edwin and Laura (Pierce) Wheelock, and five siblings. Her father, a descendant of John Adams, had been a pastor for many years in Cambridge.

Wheelock's education began under the care of her mother. She was a student at the Underhill Academy in Vermont, and the public high school in Reading, Massachusetts, from which she graduated in 1874. In preparation for entry to Wellesley College, she studied at Chauncy-Hall School, in Boston, where she became an excellent classical and German scholar, and a writer of both prose and verse. Towards the close of her course in that school, she was drawn towards the education of very young children according to the kindergarten system, and abandoned her plans for Wellesley. Instead, she took a thorough course of instruction at the Kindergarten Training School conducted by Ella Frances Snelling Hatch, receiving her diploma in 1879 from Elizabeth Peabody. She continued her studies in Europe under Johann Heinrich Pestalozzi and Maria Montessori.

Career

Educator
Wheelock began to teach in the recently established kindergarten of the Chauncy-Hall School, remaining in that role for about 10 years. Her work made her a successful exponent and advocate of the system of Friedrich Fröbel, which she was often called upon to expound before educational institutes and conventions. For at least four years, she taught a training class of candidates for the kindergarten service, coming from all parts of the United States and Canada, increasing in number from year to year.

Established in 1888, she was the founder and head of Wheelock Kindergarten Training School. It became Wheelock College in 1939, or 1945. She served as president of the International Kindergarten Union (I.K.U., 1895–99); and was the chair of its Committee of Nineteen (1905–09) and chair, of the Committee for the Fröbel Pilgrimage (1911).

Lecturer

Her interest in young children led her into Sunday school work, and she soon became superintendent of a large primary class connected with the Berkeley Temple, in Boston. Her success in that work won her a reputation, and she became a favorite speaker in Sunday school institutes and gatherings, as well as those for general educational purposes in New England, Philadelphia, Pittsburgh, St Louis, Chicago, Minneapolis, St. Paul, and Montreal. Wheelock devoted a great part of her summer vacation to work of that sort. She also taught a large class of adults in the Summer School of Methods in Martha's Vineyard, and gave a model lesson weekly, for eight months in the year, to a class of about 200 primary Sunday school teachers.

Writer and translator
In addition to her lecture work, Wheelock translated for Barnard's Journal of Education several important German works, and contributed many practical articles to other educational journals. She also translated and published several of Johanna Spyri's popular stories for children, under the title of Red Letter Tales. She published weekly in The Congregationalist Magazine a department called "Hints to Primary Teachers", in the same line of work. Her unpublished autobiography is titled My life story.

Personal life and death
Wheelock was a member of the Twentieth Century Club. She died in Boston, October 1, 1946. Her papers are held by Wheelock College.

Selected works 

 Over and over, and other stories
 Jack and Ted, and other stories, 18??
 Nettie's muff : and other stories, 18??
 Polly's minutes, and other stories, 18??
 A rainy day, and other stories, 18??
 The Hobby horse, and other stories, 188?
 Ben and the berries, and other stories, 188?
 Froebel materials to aid a comprehension of the work of the founder of the kindergarten. ..., 1887
 Sara's gift, and other stories, 1890
 Child songs, 1890
 The Moral Influence of the Kindergarten, 1893
 Old testament stories, 1894
 Ideal Relation of Kindergarten to Primary Schools, 1894
 Clare's thanksgiving bag, and other stories, 1894
 Spice and allspice, and other stories, 1894
 Daisy's lesson : and other stories, 1894
 Reubie's resolve, and other stories, 1894
 Letters from Europe, 1903
 Report for Committee of Nineteen of the International Kindergarten Union, 1907
 Kindergarten Pilgrimage to the Haunts of Froebel, 1910
 The Froebel Pilgrimage of 1911, 1911
 Signs of Kindergarten Progress, 1911
 The function of the kindergarten in the public-school system., 1912
 The Little White Schoolhouse, 1915
 What's in a Name?, 1918
 The Kindergarten children's hour, 1920
 Talks to mothers, 1920
 Pioneers of the Kindergarten in America, 1923
 Ideas and Ideals, 1924
 The Wheelock School, 1926
 Annie Laws, 1927
 The kindergarten in New England, 1935
 History of the kindergarten movement in the mid-western states and in New York, 1938
 History of the kindergarten movement in the southeastern states and Delaware, 1939
 From the Kindergarten to the Primary School, 1942
 Childhood days, 19??

See also

 Ralph Wheelock

References

Citations

Attribution

Bibliography 
 DuCharme, Catherine C. "Lucy Wheelock: Her Life and Work" Childhood Education 76 no. 3, 164–9. Spring 2000.

External links
 
 
 
 Wheelock College Library  Milestones: A Timeline of Wheelock College
 Biography of Lucy Wheelock at wheelockgenealogy.com

1857 births
1946 deaths
19th-century American non-fiction writers
19th-century American women writers
People from Cambridge, Vermont
People from Reading, Massachusetts
Educators from Vermont
University and college founders
Wheelock College faculty
American educators
American autobiographers
American women non-fiction writers
Women autobiographers
Chapel Hill – Chauncy Hall School alumni
19th-century American translators
Presidents of Wheelock College
American women academics
Wikipedia articles incorporating text from A Woman of the Century
Women heads of universities and colleges